Syed Mohsin Ali (12 December 1948 – 14 September 2015) was a Bangladeshi politician. He served as the Member of Parliament from Moulvibazar-3 and the Social Welfare Minister of the Government of Bangladesh. He was given Independence Day Award in 2017 by the Government of Bangladesh.

Early life 
Ali began his education in Kolkata. He passed Junior Cambridge and Senior Cambridge from St. Xavier's College. Then he studied in Bengali medium for some days in Bangladesh. Then again he completed diploma in management from Kolkata.

Career
Ali started his politics as a Bangladesh Chhatra League activist. He served as the president of the Moulvibazar unit of Awami League during 1998–2005. He was elected as the municipality's chairman three times. He fought the Liberation War as a commander of the Mukti Bahini under General MAG Osmani and was a member of the central committee of Sector Commanders Forum. He was a member of the National Freedom Fighters' Council and a central committee member of the Sector Commanders' Forum.

Personal life 
Ali was married to Syeda Saira Mohsin, also a Member of Parliament.

Death 
Ali died on 12 January 2015 in Singapore. He is buried next to his parents in the graveyard next to Dargah-e-Shah Mustafa.

References

1948 births
2015 deaths
Recipients of the Independence Day Award
Awami League politicians
Mukti Bahini personnel
Social Welfare ministers of Bangladesh
10th Jatiya Sangsad members
9th Jatiya Sangsad members
People from Moulvibazar District
Bangladeshi people of Arab descent